The 1940 North Carolina lieutenant gubernatorial election was held on November 5, 1940. Democratic nominee Reginald L. Harris defeated Republican nominee Halsey B. Leavitt with 75.64% of the vote.

Primary elections
Primary elections were held on May 25, 1940.

Democratic primary

Candidates
Reginald L. Harris, former Speaker of the North Carolina House of Representatives
W. Erskine Smith, businessman
Lister A. Martin
Daniel L. Tompkins

Results

Republican primary

Candidates
Halsey B. Leavitt, businessman
J. Forrest Witten

Results

General election

Candidates
Reginald L. Harris, Democratic
Halsey B. Leavitt, Republican

Results

References

1940
Gubernatorial
North Carolina